Fighting Gravity is an American music group based out of Richmond, Virginia, United States. Originally a ska band called Boy O Boy, Fighting Gravity has incorporated a variety of music into their style, including reggae, rock, and pop.  Fighting Gravity was formed while its original members were attending Virginia Tech. 
In the late 1990s, Fighting Gravity was the subject of a five-page article in Rolling Stone by senior editor David Wild as part of the summer college issue. The band has maintained a sizeable East Coast concert following.

History
In 2007, Fighting Gravity, along with Dave Matthews Band, Barenaked Ladies, Guster, and O.A.R., took part in the IZStyle Winter Tour, a series of concerts aimed at raising awareness of alternative and renewable energy sources. The band's last official shows were in the 2007 time frame and all members have continued to be active musicians. Since the breakup, Mike Boyd took the position as the Director of Performing Arts at the Collegiate School in Richmond, Virginia. Schiavone McGee toured in support of a solo CD released in October 2010 entitled My Only Secret, and then went on to perform as a vocalist for the band In Full. Rich Stine went on to form and play in Elevator to Space and toured with Stephen Kellogg and the Sixers for a short time before moving on to music production and engineering. Philippe Herndon founded Caroline Guitar Company, an effects pedal company. Their first pedal, the Wave Cannon distortion, was released in 2010. Dave Peterson is promoting concert series throughout Virginia with Seven Hills Presents. Karl von Klein is currently the jazz and orchestra instructor at the Maggie L. Walker Governor's School. Jim Pennington was the band director at Freeman High School and is now the band director at Deep Run High School. Eric Lawson continues to perform as keyboardist for Flat Elvis, a Richmond-based '80s band. He is a freelance music journalist and works for a tech company. Michael Sauri is one of the guitar players in Schiavone McGee's band and owns a home remodeling contracting company called Tri-Vista in Arlington.

Fighting Gravity performed a few reunion shows in 2017, with the last of the year being performed as part of the 102.1 The X Miracle on Broad Street Tour at The National in Richmond on December 26 and 27, along with The NorVa on the 28th and a D.C. show in Spring 2019.

Musical style
In late 2003 and early 2004, Fighting Gravity consciously decided to change their musical style. The band released the horn section and changed its songwriting style to a more guitar-driven rock. The change was welcome among most, but had a few skeptics.

Awards and accolades
Fighting Gravity has sold more than 300,000 albums and performed before more than one million people in the United States and abroad, including locales such as Tokyo and Honduras, and has performed two USO tours overseas for United States troops.  Fighting Gravity is supported by 25,000 email subscribers and 1,500 street team members.

Band members
Originally while in Blacksburg, VA the band consisted of guitarist/Vocalist David "Tree" Triano, bassist/vocalist David Peterson, Vocalist Tim Greening, original drummer Jamie Bruce, then drummer Tom Brennan and next Mike Boyd, trumpet players Jane Roebuck and Tim Altman, Sax player John Edens and Keyboardist Dee Campbell.  After moving to Richmond, VA from VA Tech....Lead singer Schiavone McGee, Keyboardist Eric Lawson, Trumpet dude Jim Pennington, trombonist Chris Leitch joined the band. In 1995, Pennington departed and was replaced by saxophonist Karl von Klein. In 1996, Chris Leitch departed and was replaced by trombonist/percussionist John Utley. In 1997, Karl von Klein departed, replaced by saxophonist Mike Ghegan. In 1999, Ghegan departed, replaced by trombonist/turntablist Stefan Demetriadis. Guitarist Michael Sauri replaced a departed Triano in 2000. In 2001, a rotation of horns brought saxophonist Kevin Tyser into the section. The horns were phased out in 2003-2004. Other former members include guitarists Philippe Herndon, Sinakone Phrakhansa and Rich Stine. As of 2007, the band had three core members: Schiavone McGee, David Peterson and Mike Boyd.

Discography

Studio albums
Boy O Boy O Boy (1991)
Shish-ska-BOB (1992)
Bobsled (1992)
No Stopping, No Standing (1994)
Forever=One Day (1996)
Everywhere and In Between (1998) (MP3.com album) 
You and Everybody Else (1998)
Hello Cleveland (1999) (live album) 
Flood Zone (2000) (live album)
Under the Radar (2001) (live acoustic album)
Blue Sky and Black (2006)

References

Further reading
 Fighting Gravity: An Interview With Mike Boyd (April 2015)
 Spotlight On: Fighting Gravity Band Trying To Rise Above Ground Level (May 1996)
 Never Forgotten (December 2017)

Third-wave ska groups
Musical groups from Virginia
American ska musical groups